Dennis Wagner (born March 9, 1958) is an American football coach.  He was the head football coach at Briar Cliff University from 2017 to 2020.  Wagner served as the head football at Wayne State College in Wayne, Nebraska from 1989 to 1996 and at Western Carolina University from 2008 to 2011. He took over as the twelfth head coach of the Western Carolina Catamounts football program on December 31, 2007 and resigned on November 13, 2011.

Playing career
Wagner begin his collegiate playing days in 1976 at Drake University, then transferred to Ellsworth Community College in Iowa Falls, Iowa, where he became a JUCO All-American and team captain.  Wagner completed his playing career at the University of Utah, and was selected team captain his senior season.  He earned All-Western Athletic Conference (WAC) honors and an honorable-mention All-America honor as an offensive guard.

Head coaching record

Football

References

1958 births
Living people
American football centers
American football offensive guards
Briar Cliff Chargers football coaches
Drake Bulldogs football players
Ellsworth Panthers football players
Fresno State Bulldogs football coaches
Liberty Flames football coaches
Luther Norse football coaches
Nebraska Cornhuskers football coaches
St. Cloud State Huskies football coaches
Utah Utes football players
UNLV Rebels football coaches
Wayne State Wildcats football coaches
Western Carolina Catamounts football coaches
William Penn Statesmen football coaches
College track and field coaches in the United States
Sportspeople from Cedar Rapids, Iowa
People from Waverly, Iowa